The Cooum river, or simply Koovam, is one of the shortest classified rivers draining into the Bay of Bengal. The river is highly polluted in the urban area (Chennai). Along with the Adyar River running parallel to the south and the Kosasthalaiyar River, the river trifurcates the city of Chennai and separates Northern Chennai from Central Chennai. It is also sometimes known as Thiruvallikenni river

Its source is in a place by the Kesavaram Anaicut built across Kallar river in Vellore district adjoining Chennai district. From its origin in the Kesavaram village to Thandurai (Pattabiram), Thiruverkadu Anaikat, the river remains unpolluted. Beyond this, the river is highly polluted till its mouth in the Bay of Bengal.

Owing to intensive use of surface water upstream for agriculture, indiscriminate pumping of groundwater leading to reduced base flow in the river, formation of sand bar at the mouth of the river, discharge of untreated sewage and industrial effluents and encroachment along the banks, the river, especially the downstream, has been highly polluted. In 2018 alone, about 21,665 tonnes of waste was removed from the river.

History
The Cooum was earlier known as the Triplicane river. The name of Cooum appears to be derived from Tamil literature. The name may have been derived from the Tamil term coopam meaning 'well' or 'deep pit'. The word coovalan denotes a person who is well versed in the science of ground water, well water and stagnant water.

Once this river was said to have its origin in Dharmapuri district, but now due to some earth table changes, it has shortened its course to Thiruvallur district. Ancient documents from the nearby temples states about one 'reaching salvation' on having a dip in the Cooum. The Cooum river was then clean and unpolluted.

For centuries, Cooum has been an integral part of the socio-economic and cultural life of the city. Till the early twentieth century, it was a clean river, most suitable for navigation. In ancient times, it played a pivotal part in the far-flung maritime trade between the Roman Empire, South India and Sri Lanka. Cooum's proximity to the ancient port of Manarpha or Mylapore added to the river's strategic importance. Manarpha was frequented by Roman merchants who came here to buy Indian textiles, gemstones and spices. In return, India procured gold, silver, copper and high-quality wine from the Romans. Archaeologists have discovered ancient Roman wine jars, and Roman and Chinese coins, on the banks of the river. In the late eighteenth century, Pachaiyappa Mudaliar, the renowned philanthropist, bathed in this river before offering prayers at the Komaleeswarar Temple in Komaleeswaranpet.

Cooum River and the nearby Elambore River (or North River), which flows into the Cooum at its mouth, were running very close to each other near the former Central Jail area opposite Chennai Central. During floods, both the watercourses inundated the whole area. In the 1700s, the two rivers were linked by a cut to equalise the floods in both the rivers and a bridge was constructed between these rivers in 1710 across the cut.

Polluted part of the Cooum is presently spoiled by filth and pollution, and the water quality has considered to be highly toxic and completely non-potable. The 2004 tsunami cleaned the mouth of the river; however, the river returned to its usual polluted self within a short period. Nevertheless, the river is still being used for drinking water needs of many villages in the banks of the unpolluted part of the river.

Origin and course

Close to Egmore, the river forks into two—the northern and the southern arms—both of which join again near the Napier bridge, thus forming an island, known as the Island Grounds. The northern part of the Buckingham Canal joins the Cooum near the old Central Jail while the southern part of the same canal emerges from the river, just behind the University of Madras campus. The river finally joins the Bay of Bengal south of the Fort St George, just below the Napier Bridge. Once a fresh water source, it is today a drainage course inside the city of Chennai. Once a fishing river, it has borne the brunt of the city's unplanned developmental explosion. The Kesavaram dam diverts the river into the Chembarambakkam Lake from which water is used for the supply of drinking water to the city of Chennai. Thereafter, the flow of water in the river is much reduced.

Three ancient Shiva temples are located at the source of the river. The first is Tiruvirkolam, in Cooum village, and the other is at Ilambaiyankottur. The third is Thiruverkadu Shiva temple. Koyambedu temple is also in its banks. These temples have been featured in the Thevaram sung by the Saivite saint Thirugnana Sambandar. There is one more temple called the Veerebathrasami temple. The god in the temple is otherwise known as "Akoramoorthy". This temple is at Pillayarkuppam,  from Cooum village. In ancient Tamil Nadu, under the Chola Empire, the river Cooum was referred to as Kashtabudhyotpathihi. They all form a group of villages called Padhinaru Nattham. The river drains into the Bay of Bengal at Chepauk in Chennai marking the northernmost boundary of the Marina Beach. The delta also marks the southern boundary of the Port of Chennai.

Islets and the river mouth

The major islet in the course of the river is the Island Grounds in Chennai less than a kilometre from the mouth. The river splits into two near Chinthadripet and encircles a piece of land isolating it from the surrounding land before draining into the eastern sea. However, the mouth of the river is not too wide and does not have any islet. At present, the river has to be periodically cleaned to prevent sand deposits near the river mouth, close to the Napier bridge, which are removed at frequent intervals using at least two machines to facilitate tidal action and avoid flooding. About  of sand were removed in 2010–11.

The river basin spans an area of 505.88 square kilometers.

Bridges

There are nine major bridges built over the urban part of the river. These are the Napier Bridge, the Wallajah Bridge, the Periamet Bridge, the Chintradripet Bridge or the St Andrew's Bridge, Harris Bridge, Commander-in-Chief Road Bridge, College Road Bridge, Spur Tank Bridge and the Aminjikarai Bridge. Apart from these there are several smaller bridges built across the river. The Corporation of Chennai maintains about 13 of these bridges.

A new bridge across the river connecting Golden George Nagar in Mogappair with Nerkundram is being constructed by the state highways department at a cost of  113 million. Work started in August 2010 and is expected to be completed by March 2013.

Flora and fauna
According to scientists, around 1950, Cooum had 49 species of fish, and by the late 1970s, this was reduced to 21 species. However, on date, there are no fish in the river, owing to highly toxic pollutants found in the river water.

Pollution

The river is narrow, placid, slow and meandering. The river is primarily fed by discharge from tank and water bodies and has seen a steady drop in freshwater over the years, a primary reason for its present-day condition. However, the core problem of the Cooum has been that due to the sand bar, the river mouth near the Napier Bridge gets blocked for most of the time, preventing the river water from draining into the sea. This has, eventually, made the river, in its 18-km-long stretch in the central district, a stinking cesspool.

Tests of water samples reveals almost zero dissolved oxygen and substantial presence of faecal coliform bacteria, besides heavy metals such as lead, zinc and cadmium.

The study of the river was undertaken as part of a World Bank-funded project and shows that it is 80 percent more polluted than treated sewer. Fish were able to survive in the water for only 3 to 5 hours even after samples were diluted. There are traces of heavy metals like copper and pesticides like endosulphan and lindane in it. Public Works Department sources said government agencies like Chennai Corporation and business units and retail outlets on the banks of the river were responsible for the pollution. The water has almost no dissolved oxygen, and instead there are traces of heavy metals like copper, besides sewage and sludge. Due to its narrowness and about 3,500 illegal hutments along its banks, it has not been recently desilted, which has closed it to river traffic. Per 2003 enumeration, about 9,000 families live along the river, in addition to 450 shops and commercial buildings. There are 700-odd points in the river bank where sewage flows straight into the river. There are 127 identified sewage outfalls into the river, out of which 85 are in use.

Nearly 30 per cent of the estimated  of untreated sewage being let into the waterways of Chennai daily, including by Chennai Metropolitan Water Supply and Sewerage Board, gets into the Cooum river. About 60 per cent of the untreated sewage gets into the Buckingham Canal and the Adyar River takes the rest. In 2010, about 340 sewage outfalls into the waterways were identified. Of them, more than 130 sewage outfalls were in the Cooum River and a majority of them were between Aminjikarai and Nungambakkam. In some of the spots in areas such as Maduravoyal, more than 7 tonnes of municipal solid waste is being dumped in the river every day.

Fortunately, there is another 42 km of this river which is still not polluted (as of the year 2015), which can be used to transport the water into Chennai and to store drinking water for Chennai's needs. There is huge amount of sand deposits in the banks of the unpolluted part of the cooum river that could rejuvenate the ground water level of numerous villages in the banks of this river.

Cleanup
According to the records available with the state public department, efforts to restore the waterway first began back in 1872 under the British. The earliest recorded proposal was mooted in 1890. After Independence, the then chief minister C. N. Annadurai launched a Cooum Improvement Scheme at a cost of  19 million in September 1967, six months after the Dravida Munnetra Kazhagam (DMK) party came to power for the first time in the state, when M. Karunanidhi was PWD minister. The project comprised installation of a regulator and a sand pump at the river mouth, protecting the sides of the river with cement concrete slabs from the Chetput bridge to the Napier Bridge, provision of a walkway on either side of the river, removal of encroachments on the banks of the river and, more importantly, the diversion of sewage. In addition, seven boat jetties were built. In February 1973, when Karunanidhi was chief minister, he launched a pleasure boat service at a cost of  22 million, and roving boats, powered boats and paddle boats were made available at a nominal charge. However, the efforts went futile when the sand pump developed snags. Incidentally, the jetties built for the purpose still dot the riverfront.

In 1996, when the DMK returned to power, the government made another bid—this time covering all important watercourses, including the Buckingham Canal and the Adyar. This resulted in the implementation of the  12,000-million Chennai City River Conservation Project (CCRCP) in January 2001, which was substantially supported by the Union Environment and Forests Ministry. This time, the new project aimed at arresting the sewage outfalls and strengthening the sewer network.

After the DMK took charge again in May 2006, the eco-restoration of the Cooum again came to the fore. To facilitate the implementation of the project, the Chennai River Authority, headed by the Deputy Chief Minister, was formed in December 2009 to clean up the entire stretch of the river within 10 years. This aimed at coordinating the implementation of various projects.

In 2010, the Tamil Nadu government signed an MoU with Singapore Cooperation Enterprise (SEC), a Singapore agency for the restoration project. The agency prepared a preliminary report after discussions with various stake holders of the project including Chennai Corporation, municipal administrations, Metrowater, Pollution Control Board, Slum Clearance Board and the public works department.

There is currently the World Bank–funded Irrigated Agriculture Modernisation and Water Bodies Restoration and Management Project to clean up the river, under which the upper reaches of the river are proposed to be covered. The World Bank has approved  224.1 million for the Cooum restoration project towards development of its irrigation potential. Improving the irrigation efficiency of Cooum upstream is one of the main objectives of the project. The upper region of the river, mainly Kancheepuram, Chengalpattu and Thiruvallur districts, will be benefiting from this special fund.

A team from Chennai has visited San Antonio in Texas to see how they successfully did the clean-up of a polluted river. The team comprised former Deputy Chief Minister M. K. Stalin, former Chennai Mayor M. Subramaniam and other senior officers. One of the city's dream projects is to clean up this river on or before 2020. The initiative has been taken up by the Central and State governments to clean up the river and rediscover the pleasures of traditional boat racing. The Chennai Rivers Restoration Trust (CRRT) has asked the Chennai Corporation to chalk out an action plan to remove construction debris dumped on the banks of the river.

In September 2011, the WRD began cleaning the river at a cost of  10.2 million and the work is expected to be completed within a fortnight.

In 2012, the government allotted  3,000 million towards construction of 337 sewage cleaning systems in the waterways in the city, including 105 locations in the Cooum river. Others include 49 points in Adyar river and 183 locations in the Buckingham Canal.

Other developments

A visitor centre near the mouth of the river on the Marina Beach, similar to the Marina Barrage Visitor Centre in Singapore and San Antonio Visitor Center in the United States, has been planned as part of an initiative to create awareness of the need for clean waterways.

In 2011, the Tamil Nadu Sailing Association planned to build a marina at the mouth of the Cooum river along the southern bank, where yachts and pleasure boats could dock. The  300-million project involves first building a breakwater in the sea so that the waters at the marina are placid and the boats do not keep bobbing up and down with the incursion of waves. However, the by-catch is a more important function—the breakwater will prevent silting and clogging of the mouthect, such as a boat repair facility, a base for the Tamil Nadu Coastal Police, and sailing academy, will be put up on the bank. By 2013, the estimate for the setting up of a sailing centre and marina to accommodate 24 yachts has increased to  450 million.

A nature trail along the river has been proposed for which a draft ecological plan has been prepared by the Tamil Nadu Urban Infrastructure and Financial Services Limited (TNUIFSL). The project is planned from College Road bridge to Chetpet bridge by the Chennai River Restoration Trust in view of the biological diversity of the area which was undisturbed for decades. According to the draft ecological plan, floral species such as Indian almond, black wattle, sacred fig, madras thorn, Indian mulberry, neem, banyan, magizham, Indian cork tree, punnai, sirukkambil, karumugai, shenbagam, bayur tree, kadamba, pavazha malli, vetiver grass, palmarosa, agave, lemon grass and subabul would be part of species along the nature trail which would play a role in erosion management. The nature trail would be based on an "elevated boardwalk" model with "uncompressed natural wood" and "fibre reinforced plastic". The entry and exit would be on College Road near the DPI complex. Apart from the parking facilities on the DPI premises, a stretch along the road between the entry point and the College Road Bridge would be demarcated for additional parking. Five points located at  intervals along the trail have been selected for erecting break-out areas including one for a canopy walk. The facility has been planned without electrical fittings and has been designed as a "day trail".

It is proposed that Chennai Metro rails are to be built about  under the bed of the river. The line that comes from the Madras High Court area reaches the metro's Central station in front of Ripon Building, crosses the river and passes underneath the neighbourhoods of Chintadripet to reach the underground station at the new secretariat on Anna Salai. The tunnels for the metro rail are to be made without cutting open the ground, with giant machines boring the tunnels as the river flows above. Custom-made tunnel boring machines costing  600 million each have been imported from Germany for the purpose.

Eco restoration and nature trail
Key aspects of the Cooum river eco-restoration plan includes 11 maintenance ways of 9.6 km, 22 walkways of 24 km, and 17 cycle tracks of 19 km, in addition to 24 parks and riverfront vegetation. The total budget for the eco-restoration is  19,340 million.

As part of the eco-restoration, in July 2018, the corporation began work on the 1.5-km nature trail between the College Road bridge in Nungambakkam and the Munroe bridge in Chetput. Modelled on the San Antonio River Walk in the United States, the trail is being built in two phases at a cost of  98.2 million and includes a butterfly park in a 5000 square meter area. Given the raise in the maximum flood level in the past years being 70% to 5.94 meters, the boardwalk has been increased from 3.5 meters to more than 6 meters using corrosion-resistant steel. The boardwalk will measure 1.65 meters and will be covered with greenery, with a provision to park 70 vehicles. The butterfly park will be built in the second phase.

Occasional water flows
During the Indian Ocean tsunami of 2004, the empty waterway enabled it to take in much of the incoming ocean water. Some say this would not have been possible had the river been in full flow.

In November 2005, three days of torrential rains flushed out the waste and cleaned up the river, and the river looked clear for a brief period. Egrets and cormorants too were cited flocking the river to feast on fish.

Legacy
A 1928 poem by V. H. Shipley describes the river as follows:Of dirt and smell your sources wake... And near the sea where one would think Your water might be cleaner, It forms a cesspit by the bridge, Adjoining the Marina. Oh viscid stream! Oh smelling flood. Oh green and beastly river!

See also
Adyar river
Kosasthalaiyar river
Water management in Chennai

References

External links 

 District Profile – Rivers
 Cooum River Pollution
 History of Cooum River
 

Geography of Chennai
Rivers of Tamil Nadu
Rivers of India